The Paragua River is a river of Venezuela. It is part of the Orinoco River basin. It is the largest tributary of the Caroní River.

The river drains the Guayanan Highlands moist forests ecoregion.

See also
List of rivers of Venezuela

References

Rand McNally, The New International Atlas, 1993.

Rivers of Venezuela